Burgk is a village and a former municipality in the district Saale-Orla-Kreis, in Thuringia, Germany. Since December 2019, it is part of the town Schleiz. The well preserved medieval Burgk Castle is situated near the village.

References

Former municipalities in Thuringia
Saale-Orla-Kreis
Principality of Reuss-Greiz